Peter, Infante of Aragón (1406 – 1438 besieging Naples, Italy), Viceroy of Sicily (1424–1425) and Duke of Noto, was the sixth child of King Ferdinand I of Aragón and Countess Eleanor of Alburquerque.

Future king John, Henry and Peter were a most troublesome princely group, known as the Infantes of Aragon, nagging, invading, and fighting all over the lands of their rather peaceful cousin and brother in law, king Juan II of Castile, disrupting, robbing and bringing havoc to the Castilian peasants and much opposed to Álvaro de Luna.

Then, when king Alfonso V of Aragón, the eldest brother, decided to leave Aragón to conquest the kingdom of Naples and live there, leaving his wife, a sister of his much abused and battered cousin the king of Castile, Juan II of Castile, to have some 17 Aragonese-Italian illegitimate children from several Italian nobility women never returning to Spain, his brothers ran with him, too, circa 1432, thirsty for Neapolitan adventures, including the disastrous  naval battle of Ponza but also the conquest of Gaeta.  Both Aragonese princes  ("infants" in Spanish): Peter, Duke of Noto in Italy died in battle, aged 32, in Italy, when attacking Naples; and Henry died in Spain, also in battle, aged 45, respectively.

1406 births
1438 deaths
Italian nobility
Viceroys of Sicily
Sons of kings